Tarves, Aberdeenshire, is a small village, situated in the Formartine area of North East Scotland and lies between Oldmeldrum and Methlick.

History
Much of the village was planned and laid out by the Marquess of Aberdeen in the 19th century but the history of the parish goes back considerably earlier. The place name and those of locations nearby show evidence of Brythonic roots. A derivation from a cognate of the Welsh word tarw, 'bull' would seem possible (see Thurso). A Bronze Age hoard of weapons was found near Tarves in the nineteenth century and was donated by the Earl of Aberdeen to the British Museum in 1858. Dating to between 1000 and 850 BC, the hoard was made entirely from bronze and consists of three swords, a pommel, a chape and two pins (two items of which were not part of the original gift and are now lost).

Notable residents
Alexander Forbes Irvine of Drum FRSE (1818–1892) advocate and philosopher
Duncan Mearns Moderator of the General Assembly of the Church of Scotland in 1821., minister of Tarves 1799 to 1816

Tarves today
The community has a heritage group that provides a registered museum and heritage centre. The village is situated very close to Haddo House and Tolquhon Castle.

References

External links
Tarves.org.uk
Tarvesheritage.org.uk

Villages in Aberdeenshire